The LoDaisKa site is a prominent archaeological site in the U.S. state of Colorado, located within a rockshelter near Morrison.  The rockshelter was first inhabited by people of the Archaic through the Middle Ceramic period, generally spanning 3000 BC to 1000 AD.

Geography
Located near the town of Morrison, off U.S. Route 285, the site is located in the southern Rocky Mountains foothills, at about  elevation, where uplifted Dakota Sandstone formed a steep hogback. The rockshelter is sheltered by distinctive 60 foot "red rock" formation, caused by an uplift of Fountain Formation rock.  The Morrison area is between the locations of two important early people:  Desert societies of the Great Basin west of the Rocky Mountains and those of the Great Plains, which lies to the east of the Rocky Mountain foothills.

History
Within the Denver basin, prehistoric cultural periods are traditionally identified as: Paleo-Indian, Archaic and Ceramic periods.  Within the LoDaisKa site, five defined complexes were assigned from A to E by Cynthia C. Irwin (later Cynthia Irwin-Williams) and Henry Irwin, complex E being the oldest phase.

Paleo-Indians
The period immediately preceding the first humans coming into Colorado was the Ice Age Summer starting about 16,000 years ago.  For the next five thousand years the landscape would change dramatically and most of the large animals would become extinct.  Receding and melting glaciers created the Plum and Monument Creeks, the Castle Rock mesas and unburied the Rocky Mountains.  Large mammals, such as the mastodon, mammoth, camels, giant sloths, cheetah, bison antiquus and horses roamed the land.  There were a few Paleo-Indian cultures, distinctive by the size of the tools they used and the animals they hunted.  People in the first, Clovis complex period, had large tools to hunt the megafauna animals of the early Paleo-Indian period.  With time, the climate warmed again and lakes and savannas receded.  The land became drier, food became less abundant, and as a result of the giant mammals became extinct.  People adapted by hunting smaller mammals and gathering wild plants to supplement their diet.  A new cultural complex was born, the Folsom tradition,  with smaller projectile points to hunt smaller animals.  Aside from hunting smaller mammals, people adapted by gathering wild plants to supplement their diet.

The earliest artifacts at the LoDaisKa rockshelter date from the Paleo-Indian period; the remains were from Complex E.

Archaic periods
People of the Archaic period (generally between 5500 and 1 BC) were hunters of small game, such as deer, antelope and rabbits, and gatherers of wild plants.  The people moved seasonally to hunting and gathering sites.  Late in the Archaic period, about AD 200–500, corn was introduced into the diet and pottery-making became an occupation for storing and caring food.

LoDaisKa site is considered to be a Mount Albion complex, which was an Early Archaic culture of the Plains from about 4050 to 3050 BC, particularly distinguished by their Mount Albion corner-notched projectile.  Magic Mountain, in the western foothills near Denver, and Mount Albion were both similar or related to the Albion Boarding House phase.  A report published in 1966 found no correlation between the complexes.

Ceramic periods
The Early Ceramic, or Woodland, period began in the Plains about AD 1 with the defining distinction of the creation of cordwrapped pottery, development of settlement areas, and use of smaller projectile points for bow and arrow technology.  Artifacts found reveal into the Middle Ceramic period.  Few Colorado rockshelters have been shown to have been inhabited for such a long period of time.

Archaeology
The LoDaisKa site artifacts include a hides, macrobotanical remains, wood artifacts, and a substantial collection of nonperishable artifacts from 3000 BC to AD 1000, which are classified into five site specific complex periods, from A through E.

Artifacts by complex period

Nelson also identified the general presence of seven lumps of red and yellow ochre stones, possibly the paint stones in Complex D.  Stone cists used to store seeds were also mentioned, the time and culture is unknown.

In 1961, researchers reported the results of radiocarbon dating the site: they concluded that the earliest occupation of the site was around 3000 BC and that it was inhabited until at least AD 1000.  As well, projectile points from LoDaisKa resemble and are contemporaneous with those found at such Great Plains sites such as the McKean site in Wyoming and Signal Butte in Nebraska; all these sites were inhabited during the time known in the eastern United States as the Woodland period.

Excavation and studies

Historical significance
Findings by the earliest archaeologists to investigate LoDaisKa were highly influential: regional archaeologists often interpreted their findings in accordance with what was known of LoDaisKa, and many other sites were excavated in part to answer questions that had resulted from research at LoDaisKa.  In 2003, the LoDaisKa site (designated site ID 5JF142) was listed on the National Register of Historic Places, qualifying because of the importance of the archaeological evidence found there.

See also
 List of prehistoric sites in Colorado
 National Register of Historic Places listings in Jefferson County, Colorado

Notes

References

Archaic period in North America
Geography of Jefferson County, Colorado
Archaeological sites on the National Register of Historic Places in Colorado
Paleo-Indian archaeological sites in Colorado
Plains Woodland period
Rock shelters in the United States
National Register of Historic Places in Jefferson County, Colorado